James Peter Pavese (born May 8, 1962) is an American former professional ice hockey player who played 328 games in the National Hockey League between 1981 and 1989. He was drafted as the 52nd overall pick by the St. Louis Blues in the 1980 NHL entry draft. He was known as a gritty "stay at home" defender with the St. Louis Blues, New York Rangers, Detroit Red Wings, and Hartford Whalers.

Career statistics

Regular season and playoffs

External links 
 

1962 births
Living people
American men's ice hockey defensemen
Colorado Rangers players
Detroit Red Wings players
Hartford Whalers players
Ice hockey players from New York (state)
Kitchener Rangers players
Montana Magic players
New Haven Nighthawks players
New York Rangers players
Salt Lake Golden Eagles (CHL) players
Sault Ste. Marie Greyhounds players
St. Louis Blues draft picks
St. Louis Blues players
Sportspeople from New York City
People from Kings Park, New York
Peterborough Petes (ice hockey) players